Guitar pickup potting is a process whereby the fine wire coils of a guitar pickup are encapsulated in a substance that inhibits movement of the coil. Guitar pickups are generally made from bobbins wrapped in many thousands of turns of fine wire. If the wire is left unpotted it is possible for unwanted microphonics or oscillations to occur, causing the pickup to "howl". This is often apparent when using overdriven amplifiers and distortion pedals.
Potting also protects the delicate winding from damage.

Generally, the potting medium is a wax mixture that is melted(see photo) and then permeates the wire coils. Other substances such as nitrocellulose lacquer or epoxy resins can also be used.

References

Van Halen in Stars Guitars: Dave Hunter p.255

Video
Potting pickups - a guitar building tutorial following the wax potting process: Crimson Custom Guitars
Wax Potting - Custom Curtis Novak Pickups - Fender Jaguar

See also
 Potting_(electronics)

Guitars